Berom or Birom (Cèn Bèrom) is the most widely spoken Plateau language in Nigeria. The language is locally numerically important and is consistently spoken by Berom of all ages in rural areas. However, the Berom are shifting to Hausa in cities. The small Cen and Nincut dialects may be separate languages. Approximately 1 million (2010) people speak in this language.

Berom is spoken in a large area just to the south of Jos city in Plateau State, Nigeria.

History 
The Berom have a link to the Nok culture, a civilization that existed between 200BC to 1000AD. Generally, the Berom speakers are identified to live in the core Jos Plateau and down the low plains of Kaduna State.

Dialects 
The Berom dialect clusters are:

Gyel–Kuru–Vwang
Du–Foron
Fan–Ropp–Rim–Riyom–Heikpang
Bachit
Gashish
Rahoss-Tahoss

Phonology

Consonants 
Eastern Berom consists of twenty-four consonant phonemes:

In Berom, approximants are found in the last position, for example- orthographic rou is /ròw/ and vei is /vèj/.

/ts/ occurs in the Foron dialect.

Vowels 
This language consists of seven vowel phonemes:

Berom consists of three type of tones and four glide tones (Bouquiaux 1970). The glide tones are treated here as rising and falling tones. The tones are as follows:

/tút / = (to climb) for a high tone

/shɛl/ = (small) No tone mark is demonstrated for the Mid tone.

/bàsa/ = (to teach, read,) for a low tone

/nepâs/ = (new) for a falling tone

/sǎn/ = (empty) for a rising tone

Orthography 
Berom orthography:

a, b, c, d, e, ɛ, f, g, gb, h, i, j, k, kp, l, m, n, ng, o, ɔ, p, r, s, sh, t, ts, u, v, w, y, z

References

External links
Roger Blench: Berom page

Beromic languages
Languages of Nigeria
Berom people